Polur (also Romanized as Polūr; also known as Pūlūr) is a village on the Haraz River in Bala Larijan Rural District, Larijan District, Amol County, Mazandaran Province, Iran.

Geography
The village is located on Road 77 (Haraz Road), the main route from Tehran to the Caspian Sea coast. At the 2006 census, its population was 316, in 86 families.

Mount Damavand—Alborz Mountains
It is well known for being a popular base to climb Mount Damavand in the Lar National Park, part of the Central Alborz mountain range. The 5,610 m (18,410 ft) volcano is the highest point in Iran and in the Middle East region.

Gallery

See also

References

External links

Populated places in Amol County
Alborz (mountain range)
Tourist attractions in Amol
Tourist attractions in Mazandaran Province